Francisco Alves Albino (2 November 1912 – 25 February 1993), best known as Albino, was a Portuguese footballer who played as a midfielder.

Over the course of 13 seasons, he amassed Primeira Liga totals of 172 games and twelve goals, spending the all of his career at Benfica, winning nine major titles.

Career

Club
Born in Tortosendo, a village in the vicinity of the Serra da Estrela, Albino arrived at Benfica at the age of 17, under Arthur John reign, to represent the youth teams.

A slender, but hard-working footballer; at 20 years old, manager Ribeiro dos Reis gave him, an opportunity with the first team, when they faced Braga Regional team in a friendly on 26 December 1932. His official debut came twelve days later, in a home win against F.C. Barreirense.

Over the next decade, he assumed a vital role in the midfield of Benfica, first at the right, and later at the middle, playing side by side with Gaspar Pinto and Francisco Ferreira. His teammates nicknamed him Tempero (seasoning) because of his trademark quote — Quando é que vem o tempero? (When does the seasoning arrive?) — in reference to the prize money awarded for wins.

He played his last match on 8 April 1945 in a five-nil trashing of Vitória de Guimarães, after well over 300 official games, and with six championship's won. For his dedication, the club awarded him with the Sócio de Mérito (Merit Member) and Águia de Prata (Silver Eagle).

International
Albino made his debut for Portugal, against Spain in a 3–3 draw on 5 May 1935. He was capped 10 times, with his last in a 2–4 loss against Switzerland on 12 February 1939.

Honours
Benfica
 Primeira Divisão: 1935–36, 1936–37, 1937–38, 1941–42, 1942–43, 1944–45
 Taça de Portugal: 1939–40, 1942–43, 1943–44
 Campeonato de Portugal: 1934–35
 Campeonato de Lisboa: 1932–33, 1939–40

See also
 List of one-club men

References
General
 

Specific

External links
 
 
 

1912 births
1993 deaths
Association football midfielders
Portuguese footballers
Portugal international footballers
S.L. Benfica footballers